Clive Rowlands OBE (born 14 May 1938) is a former Welsh rugby union footballer and later coach.

Rowlands was born in Upper Cwmtwrch.  As recorded in the preface for the book 'The Children of Craig-Y-Nos', Rowlands was admitted in 1947, as an eight-year-old, to Craig-y-nos TB hospital in Breconshire. He was given a rugby ball as a gift and accidentally kicked it through a glass door, for which he was put in a straitjacket for a week. A teacher by profession, he played club rugby at scrum-half for Abercraf, Pontypool, Llanelli and Swansea. He captained Pontypool in the 1962 – 63 season, and captained Swansea in the 1967–1968 season

Unusually, his first cap for Wales against England in 1963 was as captain, a position which he retained for his next 13 caps between 1963 and 1965, leading Wales to their first Triple Crown victory since 1952. He captained Wales in every game he played including Wales' first match outside of Europe and its first in the Southern Hemisphere; played against East Africa in Nairobi on 12 May 1964, Wales winning 8-26.

In the 1963 Five Nations match against Scotland, in wet and muddy conditions, Rowlands decided to kick for touch as many times as possible, with the result that there were 111 line-outs in the match and Wales outside-half David Watkins only touched the ball five times. Wales won 6-0 (including a drop goal from Rowlands, his only international points) but the International Rugby Board eventually responded with a change in the laws in 1970, eliminating the gain in ground for kicks directly into touch from outside the team's own 22.

After retiring as a player, Rowlands was coach of the Welsh national team for 29 matches between 1968 and 1974, becoming the youngest person to hold this position. This was a successful period for Wales, including a Grand Slam in 1971 and included the tour of New Zealand in 1969. He was manager of the British and Irish Lions tour to Australia in 1989, managed the British Isles team versus a rest-of-the-world team in 1986, and also managed Wales in the 1987 Rugby World Cup. He was President of the Welsh Rugby Union in 1989.

After recovering from cancer in the 1990s, Rowlands has focused his attention on raising tens of thousands of pounds for cancer charities.

References

External links

1938 births
Living people
Abercrave RFC players
Llanelli RFC players
Officers of the Order of the British Empire
Pontypool RFC players
Rugby union players from Swansea
Rugby union scrum-halves
Swansea RFC players
Wales international rugby union players
Wales national rugby union team coaches
Wales rugby union captains
Wales Rugby Union officials
Welsh rugby union coaches
Welsh rugby union players